Upogebiidae is a family of mud shrimp crustaceans belonging to the infraorder Gebiidea, within the order Decapoda

Genera
Acutigebia Sakai, 1982
Aethogebia A. B. Williams, 1993
Arabigebicula Sakai, 2006
Austinogebia Ngoc-Ho, 2001
Gebiacantha Ngoc-Ho, 1989
Gebicula Alcock, 1901
Mantisgebia Sakai, 2006
Neogebicula Sakai, 1982
Paragebicula Sakai, 2006
Pomatogebia Williams & Ngoc-Ho, 1990
Tuerkayogebia Sakai, 1982
Upogebia Leach, 1814
Wolffogebia Sakai, 1982

References

Thalassinidea
Decapod families